Cazadores de Montaña should not be confused with Cazadores de Monte

The Cazadores de Montaña (Spanish for Mountain Huntsmen), are special Mountain troops of the Argentine Army.

Currently there are two Mountain Huntsmen units:
 The 6th Mountain Cazadores Company (Spanish: Compañía de Cazadores de Montaña 6), which is part of the 6th Mountain Infantry Brigade
 The 8th Mountain Cazadores Company (Spanish: Compañía de Cazadores de Montaña 8), which is part of the 8th Mountain Infantry Brigade

These units are specialised in mountain warfare.

See also
 List of mountain warfare forces
 Huntsmen (military)
 France: Chasseurs Alpins
 Germany: Gebirgsjäger
 Italy: Alpini
 Poland: Podhale rifles
 Romania: Vânători de munte

References

External links
 Argentine Army Official website
 Argentine Infantry Official website

Army units and formations of Argentina
Mountain units and formations